Edwin Franklin Gayle (August 18, 1875 – May 11, 1976) was an American lawyer and college football player and coach. He served as the head football coach at the University of Louisiana at Lafayette–then known as the Southwestern Louisiana Institute–in 1904.

Gayle was an 1896 graduate of Louisiana State University (LSU). He later earned a master's degree from Columbia University in 1903 and a law degree from the Tulane University Law School in 1906.

Head coaching record

References

External links
 

1875 births
1976 deaths
19th-century players of American football
American centenarians
Men centenarians
American football halfbacks
American lawyers
Louisiana Ragin' Cajuns football coaches
LSU Tigers football players
Columbia University alumni
Tulane University Law School alumni
People from Pointe Coupee Parish, Louisiana
Coaches of American football from Louisiana
Players of American football from Louisiana